The Pontifical Institute of Sacred Music is an institution of higher education of the Roman Catholic Church specifically dedicated to the study of church music. It is based in Rome, Italy, located in the former Pontifical Abbey of St Jerome-in-the-City.

History
The Institute was established by Pope Pius X in 1910 as the "School of Sacred Music". The institute was established as a body dedicated to teaching and performing "sacred music". The school opened in 1911. In July 1914, the school was declared a Pontifical Institution and was granted the power to confer academic degrees.

On 23 September 1914, newly elected Pope Benedict XV referred to the institute as part of the legacy left to him by his predecessor saying he would support and promote it in the best way possible. The following month, he assigned the Palazzo di Sant'Apollinare as the residence of the school, relocating it from via del Mascherone.

Pope Pius XI's Motu Proprio, Ad musicae sacrae (22 November 1922) confirmed the connection between the institute and the Apostolic See.

With the apostolic constitution Deus scientiarum Dominus of 1931, the institute took its present name and was included among the pontifical academic institutes. The institute moved to the former Pontifical Abbey of St Jerome-in-the-City in 1983.

In 2001, the school was received by Pope John Paul II to celebrate the 90th anniversary of the institute and to honor a previous president of the institute- Bishop Higini Angles, who was president from 1947 to 1969.

For several years in the first two decades of the 20th century, the administrator of the Pontifical Institute was the Spanish priest Alfonso Luna Sánchez, who died in Rome on April 3, 2020 at the residence of the De La Salle Brothers.

The goals of the Pontifical Institute of Sacred Music are to teach music in practical, theoretical, and historical terms, to promote the spread of traditional sacred music and encourage artistic expressions of music in the current day, and to render services of music to the Catholic churches throughout the world.

Courses offered
The Institute grants the following degrees in sacred music: Bachelor (3 years), Licentiate (2 years) and a Doctorate. The degrees are offered with one of the following foci: Gregorian chant, composition, choral direction, musicology, pipe organ and pianoforte.

Instruction in Italian is offered in harmony, counterpoint, fugue, composition, acoustics, music history and analysis, musicology, bibliography, research methods, ethno-musicology,  editing of music, notation, Gregorian chant, liturgics, piano, pipe organ, score reading, continuo (figured bass), keyboard improvisation, choral conducting and Latin.

References

External links
 Pontifical Institute of Sacred Music
 History of the Pontifical Institute of Sacred Music (The Vatican)

Education in Rome